Street Scene is a 1929 American play by Elmer Rice. It opened January 10, 1929, at the Playhouse Theatre in New York City. After a total of 601 performances on Broadway, the production toured the United States and ran for six months in London. The action of the play takes place entirely on the front stoop of a New York City brownstone and in the adjacent street in the early part of the 20th century. It studies the complex daily lives of the people living in the building (and surrounding neighborhood) and the sense of despair that hovers over their interactions. Street Scene received the 1929 Pulitzer Prize for Drama.

History

Street Scene has its origins in a play that Elmer Rice began in the mid-1920s titled Sidewalks of New York—a play without words that he wrote as a technical exercise for his own entertainment. Rice devised 15 vignettes that were a microcosm of New York life. One of these scenes presented the front of a brownstone in the early morning hours. "There was neither plot nor situation," Rice recalled. "One merely saw the house shaking off its sleep and beginning to go about the business of the day."

In the autumn of 1927, Rice returned to New York after living for almost three years in Europe, and was so taken with the vitality of the city that "almost without thinking about it" he began to reshape the brownstone-front scene into a full-length play. He began work in November 1927, addressing the play's many technical challenges—introducing some 30 characters, devising more than 75 entrances and exits in the first act alone, and making the playing of intimate scenes on a city sidewalk credible. Rice completed the play in mid-February 1928.

Street Scene was rejected by at least a dozen New York producers before it was accepted in July 1928 by Sam H. Harris. Rice's theatrical agent for this deal was Frieda Fishbein. The contract required that the play be staged by November 15; Harris' production schedule caused him to release the manuscript in October. Shortly thereafter, producer William A. Brady accepted the play. When director George Cukor walked out in the first days of rehearsal, Brady agreed to Rice directing the play himself.

Production

With settings by Jo Mielziner, Street Scene opened January 10, 1929, at the Playhouse Theatre in New York City. Rice's script indicates the play's setting is "the exterior of a 'walk-up' apartment house in a mean quarter of New York. It is of ugly brownstone." Rice was thinking of a building on West 65th Street in Manhattan while writing the play.

The main characters are Anna Maurrant, dealing with issues of infidelity; Rose Maurrant, her daughter, who struggles with the demands of her job and boss and her attraction to Jewish neighbor Sam Kaplan; Frank Maurrant, the domineering and sometimes abusive husband and father of Anna and Rose, respectively; Sam, a caring and concerned neighbor in love with Rose; and many other neighbors and passersby.

 Leo Bulgakov as Abraham Kaplan
 Eleanor Wesselhoeft as Greta Fiorentino
 Beulah Bondi as Emma Jones
 Hilda Bruce as Olga Olsen
 Russell Griffin as Willie Maurrant
 Mary Servoss as Anna Maurrant
 Conway Washburne as Daniel Buchanan
 Robert Kelly as Frank Maurrant
 T.H. Manning as George Jones
 Joseph Baird as Steve Sankey
 Jane Corcoran as Agnes Cushing
 John Qualen as Carl Olsen
 Anna Konstant as Shirley Kaplan
 George Humbert as Filippo Fiorentino
 Emily Hamill as Alice Simpson
 Frederica Going as Laura Hildebrand
 Eileen Smith as Mary Hildebrand
 Alexander Lewis as Charlie Hildebrand
 Horace Braham as Samuel Kaplan
 Erin O'Brien-Moore as Rose Maurrant
 Glenn Coulter as Harry Easter
 Millicent Green as Mae Jones
 Joseph Lee as Dick McGann
 Matthew McHugh as Vincent Jones
 John Crump as Dr. John Wilson
 Edward Downes as Officer Harry Murphy
 Ralph Willard as a Milkman
 Herbert Lindholm as a Letter-Carrier
 Samuel S. Bonnell as an Iceman and An Interne
 Mary Emerson as a Music Student
 Ellsworth Jones as Marshall James Henry
 Jean Sidney as Fred Cullen
 Joe Cogert as an Old-Clothes Man
 Anthony Pawley as an Ambulance Driver

Street Scene ran 601 performances on Broadway and toured throughout the United States. During the play's six-month run in London, Aldous Huxley became an ardent fan of Erin O'Brien-Moore, and saw her starring performance as Rose Maurrant at least three times.

Reception
"Still unwilling to write a conventional play according to the safe, stereotyped forms, Elmer Rice contents himself with writing an honest one," wrote Brooks Atkinson of The New York Times. "He has observed and transcribed his material perfectly. Never did the phantasmagorira of street episodes seem so lacking in sketchy types and so packed with fully delineated character."

Accolades
Street Scene received the 1929 Pulitzer Prize for Drama. It was included in Burns Mantle's The Best Plays of 1928–29.

Adaptations

Elmer Rice adapted his play for Samuel Goldwyn's 1931 motion picture production Street Scene, directed by King Vidor. Starring Sylvia Sidney, William Collier Jr. and Estelle Taylor, the film marked the screen debut of Beulah Bondi, who recreated her Broadway role as the malicious gossip Emma Jones. Others reprising their stage roles were Eleanor Wesselhoeft, Conway Washburne, T. H. Manning, John Qualen, Anna Konstant, George Humbert and Matthew McHugh.

Rice wrote the book for Kurt Weill's 1946 opera Street Scene, adapting his play and writing lyrics with Langston Hughes. It premiered January 9, 1947, at the Adelphi Theater, New York City.

Street Scene has been adapted for television three times:
 In a presentation by The Philco Television Playhouse on October 31, 1948, Erin O'Brien-Moore performed the role of Rose's mother Anna. The role of Rose, which O'Brien-Moore had performed on Broadway, was played by Betty Field.
 Celanese Theatre presented a 30-minute adaption on April 2, 1952, starring Colleen Gray, Paul Kelly, Ann Dvorak and Michael Wager.
 BBC Television presented an adaptation on November 15, 1959.

Revivals
New York's Brave New World Repertory Theater staged a production on a street in Brooklyn's Park Slope neighborhood in late June 2013. Fifth Street in the borough was closed for the two matinée performances.

References

External links
 
 
 1949 Theatre Guild on the Air radio adaptation of play at Internet Archive

1929 plays
Broadway plays
American plays adapted into films
Plays adapted into operas
Plays by Elmer Rice
Pulitzer Prize for Drama-winning works
Plays set in New York City
Uxoricide in fiction